Qin Jianxiao (born November 1962) is a former Chinese politician from Shanxi. During his career he has served as the Mayor of Gaoping, the Communist Party Secretary of Qinshui County, and the Party Secretary of Zezhou County. In September 2014, Qin was placed under investigation by the Communist Party's anti-corruption agency; he was removed from office and expelled from the party in November 2014.

Life and career
Qin was born and raised in Huguan County, Shanxi, under the jurisdiction of Changzhi.

He began his political career in September 1982. He spent three years teaching at Jindongnan Radio and TV University before serving in various roles in the Organization Department of Jincheng Municipal Party Committee.

In October 1996 he became the deputy County Governor of Zezhou County, a position he held until April 2003, when he was appointed the Secretary of Zezhou County Political and Legal Affairs Commission (Zhengfawei).

He was transferred to Gaoping in December 2003, and served as president of Gaoping Municipal Trade Union, Secretary of the Gaoping Municipal Discipline Inspection Commission, and a municipal Party Standing Committee member. From September 2006 to December 2009, he served as the Party Secretary and Director of Jincheng Municipal Agriculture Bureau.

In December 2009, he was named acting Mayor of Gaoping, at the same time holding the post of vice mayor and deputy party chief, he was promoted to become the mayor in April 2011. In May 2011, he was appointed the CPC Party Chief of Qinshui County, he remained in that position until March 2014, when he was transferred to Zezhou County and appointed the CPC Party Chief.

Downfall
On September 25, 2014, he was being investigated by the Party's internal disciplinary body for "serious violations of laws and regulations".  In November 2014, he was removed from office and expelled from the party. His case has been moved to judicial organs for criminal proceedings.

References

1962 births
Chinese Communist Party politicians from Shanxi
Living people
Political office-holders in Shanxi
People's Republic of China politicians from Shanxi
Politicians from Changzhi